Jonathan "Jon" Mould (born 4 April 1991) is a Welsh racing cyclist from Newport. Mould is a member of British Cycling's Olympic Academy Programme which he joined in 2010.

Mould started bike racing at the age of 14 with Newport Velo Cycling Club, and joined the British Cycling Olympic Development Programme in 2009. He was a Commonwealth Games Athlete representing Wales at the Delhi 2010 Games, and rode for the  team in 2012. He joined  for 2013. After Team UK Youth folded at the end of 2013, he signed with the  team for 2014. After one season with NFTO Mould was announced as part of the inaugural squad for the  team for the 2015 season.

Mould represented Wales at the Commonwealth Games in Glasgow, 2014.

In June 2016 Mould took his fourth Tour Series victory of the season in Durham: the win was also his third consecutive Tour Series win and the ninth of Mould's career, breaking the record of eight wins held by team-mate Ed Clancy.

On 14 April 2018 Mould secured a silver medal for Wales in the Road Race at the 2018 Commonwealth Games held on the Gold Coast, Australia.

Major results

2008
 National Track Championships
1st  Team pursuit
3rd  Scratch race
3rd  Points race
2009
 UEC European Junior Track Championships
1st  Madison (with Chris Whorral)
2nd Team pursuit
 National Track Championships
1st  Madison (with Mark Christian)
1st  Derny (paced by Courtney Rowe)
 1st  Points classification Junior Tour of Wales
 3rd UIV Cup Ghent (with Luke Rowe)
2010
 1st Presidents Road Race
 2nd Intergiro classification, Giro Della Valli Cuneesi
 3rd Welsh National Criterium Championships
 3rd UIV Cup Copenhagen (with George Atkins)
2011
 National Track Championships
1st  Omnium
1st  Scratch race
2nd  Points race
2nd  Madison
 3rd  Points race, UEC European Under–23 Track Championships
2012
 3rd  Points race – Cali, UCI Track World Cup Classics
2013
 National Track Championships
1st  Madison (with George Atkins)
1st  Omnium
1st Welsh National Road Race Championships
1st Welsh National Criterium Championships
1st Overall Tour of Jamtland
1st Young rider classification
 1st Round 6 – Colchester, Tour Series
 1st East Yorkshire Classic
 3rd  Scratch race – Manchester, UCI Track World Cup
2014
 Tour Series
1st  Sprints classification
1st Round 1 – Stoke
1st Round 5 – Durham
1st Round 6 – Edinburgh
 1st Castle Combe Easter Classic
 1st Leicester Castle Classic
 National Track Championships
2nd  Team pursuit
3rd  Points race
2015
 1st British Cycling Elite Circuit Series
1st Stafford GP
2nd Beverley Grand Prix
3rd Otley Grand Prix
 1st Round 2 - Redditch, Tour Series
 1st Welsh National Criterium Championships
 2nd Overall Totnes-Vire Stage Race
1st Stage 1
 3rd Stafford Kermesse
2016
Tour Series
1st Round 2 – Motherwell
1st Round 4 – Redditch
1st Round 5 – Aberystwyth
1st Round 6 – Durham
1st Round 8 – Stevenage
1st Round 9 – Croydon
2017
 4th Overall New Zealand Cycle Classic
1st Stage 4
2018
 1st Grand Prix des Marbriers
 2nd  Road race, Commonwealth Games

References

External links

1991 births
Living people
Welsh male cyclists
Sportspeople from Newport, Wales
Cyclists at the 2010 Commonwealth Games
Cyclists at the 2014 Commonwealth Games
Commonwealth Games medallists in cycling
Commonwealth Games silver medallists for Wales
Cyclists at the 2018 Commonwealth Games
Medallists at the 2018 Commonwealth Games